There's No One New Around You (stylized in lower-case) is the debut studio EP from the American musician pronoun.

Content
The four-track EP was released on 10-inch vinyl, compact disc and digital download on November 18, 2016. Recorded in her Brooklyn apartment, There's No One New Around You was intended to be a full-length album, until finishing the song "Snowed In", after which, she notes "it just felt like [the record] was done." The album production, mixing, artwork and photography is by Pronoun. The album title is based on an automated message from the social search engine mobile-phone application Tinder, and as Pronoun explains in an interview with City Pulse,  after "scrolling through [...] and I reached the end and that's what it said. I thought, 'this is actually really beautiful, if you take it of context.'" It is described as indie rock, post-punk and soft electronic filled with delicate, deeply personal tracks.

The song "Just Cuz You Can't" is about a long-term relationship that she "thought would never end". Its music video was directed by Sabyn Mayfield.

Reception
For the song "Just Cuz You Can't", Stereogum writes it is a "driving and urgent rock song undercut by Vellturo's mumbled, passionate delivery," and Billboard calls it an "emotionally captivating track that channels the evolving timeline of a relationship."

Track listing

Note
 All tracks are stylized in lower-case

References
Citations

Bibliography

2016 debut EPs
Self-released EPs